AASI may refer to:

 Advanced Aerodynamics and Structures Inc., an aircraft maker
 American Association of Snowboard Instructors, an offshoot of the Professional Ski Instructors of America

See also 
 Assi (disambiguation)